JiR Team Scot was a motorcycle racing team that competed in the  MotoGP season. It was formed as a collaborative effort between JiR and Team Scot

 For the team that competed in MotoGP from 2005 to 2007 under the Konica Minolta name see JiR
 For the team competing in the 2009 MotoGP season see Team Scot